The following is a timeline of the history of the city of Palma, Spain.

Prior to 20th century

 123 BCE - Roman and Spanish settlers arrive on island organised by Quintus Caecilius Metellus Balearicus.
 450 CE - Vandals in power (approximate date).
 8th century CE - Arabs in power.
 800s - Second  built around Palma.
 902 - Moorish Emirate of Córdoba in power; city called "Medina Mayurka".
 12th century - Third wall built around city.
 1114 - City taken by Catalan and Pisan forces.
 1116 - Almoravide Moors in power.
 1229 - Conquest of Majorca by Christian forces; Catalans in power.(ca)
 1230
 Carto de Poblacio (city constitution) created.
 Palma Cathedral construction begins.
 1281 -  construction begins.
 1295 - James II of Aragon in power per Treaty of Anagni.
 1302 - "Weekly market" begins.
 1311 - Bellver Castle built.
 1331 - Synagogue built.
 1343 - Consulate of the Sea established.
 1349 - Peter IV of Aragon in power.
 1390 - Public clock installed (approximate date).
 1391 -  against Jews.
 1403 - Flood.
 1456 -  (market-exchange) built.
 1488 - Spanish Inquisition begins.
 1503 - University founded.
 1521-1523 - Peasant uprising ("Brotherhoods of Mallorca").
 1541 - King Charles I of Spain visits Majorca.
 1601 - Palma Cathedral construction completed.
 1616 - Palacio Episcopal built.
 1700 - Seminary established.
 1836 - Nautical school and Institute founded.
 1839 - Diario constitucional de Palma newspaper in publication.
 1840 - Casino Palmesano established.
 1842 - Population: 40,892.
 1851
 Círculo Mallorquín established.
  (archives) active.
 1852 - Diario de Palma newspaper in publication.
 1857 -  (theatre) opens.
 1860 - Queen Isabel II of Spain visits Majorca.
 1872
  (bank) established.
 City walls dismantled.
 1875 - Inca-Palma railway begins operating.
 1880 -  founded.
 1881 -  (bank) established.
 1893 - Última Hora newspaper begins publication.
 1900 - Population: 63,937.

20th century

 1902 - Teatro Lirico (theatre) opens.
 1903 - Gran Hotel built.
 1904 - King Alfonso XIII of Spain visits Majorca.
 1910 - Fomento de turismo de Mallorca (government tourism office) created.
 1916 - RCD Mallorca football club formed.
 1925 - Palace of Marivent built.
 1936 - City bombed in the Battle of Majorca during Spanish Civil War.
 1939 -  newspaper begins publication.
 1940 - Population: 114,405.
 1945 - Es Fortí stadium opens.
 1953 -  newspaper begins publication.
 1960 - Palma de Mallorca Airport terminal built.
 1965 -  (theatre) built.
 1967 -  opens.
 1970 - Population: 234,098.
 1979 -  becomes mayor.
 1981 - El Mundo newspaper begins publication.
 1991
 Juan Fageda becomes mayor.
 Population: 308,616.
 1999
 July: 1999 Summer Universiade athletic event held in Palma.
 Son Moix stadium opens.

21st century

 2004 -  (public library) opens.
 2015 - José Hila becomes mayor.

See also
 Palma, Majorca history
 
  island

References

This article incorporates information from the Catalan Wikipedia and Spanish Wikipedia.

Bibliography

External links

 Items related to Palma, various dates (via Europeana)
 Items related to Palma, various dates (via Digital Public Library of America)

Palma de Mallorca
palma